Loma Vista is the major-label debut studio album by American band Family of the Year. It was released on July 10, 2012.  The album peaked at No. 23 on the Billboard Folk Album chart in April 2013, and has sold 32,000 copies in the United States as of August 2015.

Reception

Loma Vista received positive reviews from critics upon release. On Metacritic, the album holds a score of 78/100 based on 5 reviews, indicating "generally favorable reviews."

Track listing
All songs written by Joseph Keefe, except where noted.
 "The Stairs" (Joseph Keefe, Christina Schroeter) - 3:51
 "Diversity" - 3:40
 "St. Croix" (Joseph Keefe, James Buckey, Sebastian Keefe, Christina Schroeter) - 3:35
 "Buried" - 3:07
 "Hero" - 3:10
 "Everytime" - 2:47 
 "Living on Love" (Joseph Keefe, James Buckey, Sebastian Keefe, Christina Schroeter) - 3:23
 "Hey Ma" - 3:38
 "In the End" (Joseph Keefe, James Buckey, Sebastian Keefe, Christina Schroeter) - 4:20
 "Never Enough" - 3:19
 "Find It" (Joseph Keefe, James Buckey) - 3:50

Personnel
Joseph Keefe (vocals/guitar)
Sebastian Keefe (drums/vocals) 
James Buckey (guitar/vocals)  
Christina Schroeter (keyboard/vocals)

Charts

References

2012 albums
Nettwerk Records albums
Family of the Year albums